Liukkonen is a Finnish surname. Notable people with the surname include:

 Voitto Liukkonen (1940–2007), Finnish sports commentator 
 Ari-Pekka Liukkonen (born 1989), Finnish swimmer
 Veera Ruoho, née Liukkonen

Finnish-language surnames